Katherine Marsh (born November 11, 1974) is a writer of children's literature, most notably Nowhere Boy and  The Night Tourist. She is also an editor of nonfiction articles and books.

Life 
She was a  Prima  right y school teacher before moving to New York City, where she began writing for magazines such as Rolling Stone and Good Housekeeping. Some of her nonfiction stories about her home state of New York have appeared in The New York Times. She is now the managing editor of The New Republic Magazine, where she specializes in politics and culture. She now lives in Washington, DC. She is the author of The Night Tourist, winner of the 2008 Edgar Award for Best Juvenile Mystery, and its sequel, The Twilight Prisoner, which are both set in New York City.

Books
The Night Tourist (2007)
The Twilight Prisoner (2009)
Jepp, Who Defied the Stars (2012)
The Door by the Staircase (2016)
Nowhere Boy (2018)

References

External links 
Homepage
Publisher's website

1974 births
American children's writers
Living people
American women journalists
American women children's writers
Edgar Award winners
21st-century American women